Zhao Guofan (29 December 1924 – 1 February 2017) was a Chinese civil structural engineer. He was an academician of the Chinese Academy of Engineering.

Biography
Zhao was born in Fengyang County, Shanxi, on 29 December 1924. He had two younger brothers. By age 13, the Second Sino-Japanese War broke out, his father was conscripted into military service. Zhao and her mother fled to different cities to take refuge. Finally, they settled in the suburb of Xi'an, Shaanxi. In 1945, he was admitted to Chiao Tung University, where he majored in the Department of Civil Engineering. After graduation, he entered the East China People's Revolutionary University.

After graduating in 1949, he was recruited by the Qiqihar Railway Bureau and soon after moved to the Department of Water Conservancy, Lanzhou University. He was appointed assistant of Dalian University of Technology, in August 1950, becoming professor in 1954. During the Korean War, he was an engineer in the 810 National Defense Construction Committee. He joined the Jiusan Society in 1956. He was a visiting scholar at North Carolina State University from March 1981 to September 1981.

He died of illness in Dalian, Liaoning, on 1 February 2017, aged 92.

Works

Honours and awards
 1997 Member of the Chinese Academy of Engineering (CAE)
 1998 State Science and Technology Progress Award (Third Class)

References

External links
Zhao Guofan on the official website of the Chinese Academy of Engineering 

1924 births
2017 deaths
People from Fenyang
Engineers from Shanxi
National Chiao Tung University (Shanghai) alumni
Dalian University of Technology alumni
Members of the Chinese Academy of Engineering